Jersey Township may refer to:

Jersey Township, Jersey County, Illinois
Jersey Township, Licking County, Ohio

Township name disambiguation pages